Leiters Ford is an unincorporated community in Aubbeenaubbee Township, Fulton County, Indiana.

History
Leiters Ford, located at a ford on the Tippecanoe River, was named for John Leiter, an original owner of the town site. The Leiters Ford post office was established in 1873.

Geography

References

Unincorporated communities in Fulton County, Indiana
Unincorporated communities in Indiana